Are You with Me? is an album by the rock band Cowboy Mouth, released in 1996. It was their major label debut (MCA) and charted at 192 of the Billboard 200; it produced the single "Jenny Says," which charted on two Billboard charts.

Track listing

Personnel

Cowboy Mouth
John Thomas Griffith - lead guitar, vocals
Paul Sanchez - acoustic and rhythm guitar, vocals
Rob Savoy - bass, vocals
Fred LeBlanc - drums, percussion, guitar, vocals
with:
Peter Holsapple - organ, piano, accordion, mandolin, guitar
John Maloney - washboard
Technical
David Leonard - recording
Kevin Reagan - art direction
Jean Krikorian - design
James Minchin III - photography

References

1996 albums
Cowboy Mouth albums
MCA Records albums